Andesites is an extinct genus of cephalopod belonging to the Ammonite subclass, from the Late Jurassic. It has only been found in the Mendoza Group of Argentina.

References 

Jurassic ammonites
Ammonites of South America
Jurassic Argentina